Marquess  was a Japanese daimyō of the late Edo period, who ruled the Fukuoka Domain.

Biography

Nagahiro was the ninth son of Shimazu Shigehide, lord of Satsuma Domain; Kuroda Narikiyo, lord of Fukuoka, adopted Nagahiro in 1822 later Nagahiro married Narikiyo's daughter, Sumihime. Nagahiro's mother was a woman of humble origins named Chisa; she had attracted Shigehide's attention with her "sturdy build and great love of sake." Much like his mother, Nagahiro was also well-built. He was close in age to Shimazu Nariakira, and the two had a brotherly relationship. His childhood name was Momojiro (桃次郎).

Nagahiro succeeded his adoptive father in 1834. Much like his birth father, Nagahiro was a serious proponent of technological modernization, especially with regards to his domain's military. After Commodore Perry's arrival, Nagahiro (like his close relative, Shimazu Nariakira) was a proponent of opening the country. He greatly encouraged learning amongst his retainers, and sent them to the best schools of Edo, Osaka, and Nagasaki to absorb the Western knowledge and technical expertise which was entering the country at the time. He himself also engaged in similar efforts, listening to the anatomy lectures of Philipp Franz von Siebold in 1859.

In the Boshin War, his forces took part in the campaign against the domains of the Tōhoku region.

Nagahiro held the title of Mino no Kami (美濃守) as well as junior 2nd court rank (juni'i 従二位). In the Meiji era, he was created kōshaku (侯爵; marquess) in the new peerage system.

Family
 Father: Shimazu Shigehide (1745-1833)
 Mother: Makino Chisa
 Foster Father: Kuroda Narikiyo (1795-1851)
 Wife: Sumihime
 Daughter: Ikuhime, Miyoko (Ceacero's wife)
 Adopted Children:
 Kuroda Nagatomo
 Keihime married Shijou Takauta (Okudaira Masataka's daughter)
 Yoshihime married Matsudaira Yoshitomo (Okudaira Masanobu's daughter)

Notes

References

Further reading
Kawazoe Shōji 川添昭二 (1983). Ju ni'i Kuroda Nagahiro-kō den 従二位黒田長溥公伝. 2 Vol.s, ed. Fukuoka Komonjo o Yomu Kai. Tokyo: Bunkenshuppan 文献出版.
Yanagi Takenao 柳猛直 (1989). Hiun no hanshu Kuroda Nagahiro 悲運の藩主・黒田長漙. Fukuoka: Kaichōsha 海鳥社.

External links
Brief biography of Nagahiro

1811 births
1887 deaths
Daimyo
Kazoku
Meiji Restoration
Samurai
Kuroda clan